"Mr. Monk Gets Jury Duty" is the sixteenth and final episode of the fourth season of the American comedy-drama detective television series Monk, and is the show's 61st episode overall. The series follows the adventures of Adrian Monk (Tony Shalhoub), a private detective with obsessive–compulsive disorder and multiple phobias, and his assistant Natalie Teeger (Traylor Howard). In this episode, Monk is requested to be part of a jury for a minor crime but discovers one of the jurors is involved in a bigger crime.

"Peter Wolk wrote the episode, which drew influences from the film 12 Angry Men. When "Mr. Monk Gets Jury Duty" first aired in the United States on USA Network on March 17, 2006, it was watched by 5.4 million viewers. The episode was generally well received by critics, who praised its humor and homage to 12 Angry Men.

Plot
Captain Stottlemeyer (Ted Levine) and Lieutenant Disher (Jason Gray-Stanford) capture Miguel Escobar (Carlos Gómez), an FBI's Most Wanted List–drug lord. They encounter FBI agent Lapides (Michael Weaver), who informs them that they will babysit Escobar until he is transferred to the federal government's custody.

Elsewhere, private investigator Monk (Tony Shalhoub) has been selected for jury duty on the case of a young man named Robert Perry (Edo Walker), who has been accused of stabbing and robbing a man named Karl Pillemer (Blake Silver). The other jurors are convinced of the accused's guilty, but Monk is not. He claims that the wound was self-inflicted and the knife placed in Perry's hand while he was sleeping so Pillemer could pocket the money.

During the jury, Monk observes through the window a dog sniffing around a dumpster and deduces there is a body in the dumpster. Disher finds the body of a woman with no I.D., and Monk remembers that she was in the assembly room when the jurors were selected. The following day, Monk shows the jurors evidence to prove Pillemer's guilt. The jurors are convinced, except for Juror No. 12, Pat (Emmanuelle Vaugier), who changes her vote to guilty before leaving for the bathroom. On Pat's jacket, Monk finds traces of lime, which was used on the dumpster to hide the body.

Monk deduces that Pat killed the woman to get on jury using her identity, and has changed her vote to delay the verdict and stay in the jury room. However, none of the jurors, not even Monk, know that Pat is Escobar's girlfriend, and it is the day that Escobar will be transferred to federal custody. Monk asks the other jurors to help him reveal the woman's deception. When she returns, they switch their votes to guilty to see her reaction. She reacts by producing a gun, knocking the bailiff unconscious and leaving the jurors bound and gagged to their chairs. She draws the blinds down but leaves them uneven.

Meanwhile, Escobar is about to get on the federal courthouse elevator when his girlfriend shoots the guards. The two make their way to their escape route. Natalie, passing outside, sees the uneven blinds in the jury room window and knows something must be wrong. She frees Monk and they phone Stottlemeyer. When Escobar and his lover come down the chute, they land in the garbage dumpster, only to run into an assortment of waiting cops, who take them into custody.

Production

"Mr. Monk Gets Jury Duty" was written by Peter Wolk and directed by Andrei Belgrader. While this marked Belgrader's fourth directing credit in the series, it was Wolk's second episode, following season three's "Mr. Monk Gets Fired". Wolk, who previously worked as a criminal defense attorney, had also written for courtroom-themed works such as The Defenders and Fighting the Odds. The story was written by Wolk over a week in 2005 in Summit, New Jersey. The episode was mostly filmed in Los Angeles, apart from the opening Chinatown chase scene, which was shot on-location in San Francisco. Some exteriors were also filmed in other San Francisco Bay Area locations.

The jury subplot was heavily inspired by the 1957 film 12 Angry Men. For example, juror Mr. Cobb was named after Lee J. Cobb (who portrayed Juror No. 3 in the film), while the panning shot of the jury room was inspired by an identical shot toward the end of 12 Angry Men.

Reception
"Mr. Monk Gets Jury Duty" was first broadcast in the United States on the USA Network at 10 pm EST on March 17, 2006. According to Nielsen Media Research, the episode was viewed by an estimated number of 5.4 million people, making it the second-highest-viewed cable series of the week of March 13–19. 50,000 Monk fans from Green Bay voted it as the 12th best episode of the series in January 2007 (out of 71).

Adam Finley of TV Squad called the episode "decent," but later went on to say "[Monk's] interaction between the rest of the jurors was hysterical." A reviewer for TV Guide called it "a humdinger of an episode", praised the chemistry between Shalhoub and Howard, and said the "ID-idea" joke was "neo-screwball comedy at its best." The Digital Fix's Jon White praised the homage to 12 Angry Men, saying it shows the "obvious" care the last four episodes of the season received. The Brazilian counterpart to Universal Channel, who broadcast Monk in the country, elected it as one of the ten best episodes of the series in 2014.

Notes

References

External links

Monk (TV series) episodes
2006 American television episodes
Juries in fiction
Television courtroom dramas
Parody television episodes
Parodies of films
Twelve Angry Men